They Burn the Thistles – Ince Memed II ( means Memed the Thin) is a 1969 novel by Yaşar Kemal.  It was Kemal's second novel in his İnce Memed tetralogy.

The first Ince Memed novel won the Varlik prize for that year (Turkey's highest literary prize) and earned Kemal a national reputation. In 1961, the book was translated into English by Edouard Roditi, thus gaining Kemal his first exposure to English-speaking readers. In 1984, the novel was freely adapted by Peter Ustinov into a film (also known as The Lion and the Hawk).

Until the publication of Orhan Pamuk's My Name is Red and Snow, İnce Memed was the best-known Turkish novel published after World War II.

Plot
The plot of "They Burn the Thistles" is much the same as in the first novel "Memed, My Hawk", where Memed, a young boy from a village in Anatolia is abused and beaten by the villainous Abdi Agha, the local landowner. Having endured great cruelty towards himself and his mother, he finally escapes with his beloved, a girl named Hatche. Abdi Agha catches up with the young couple, but only manages to capture Hatche, while Memed is able to avoid his pursuers and runs into the mountains whereupon he joins a band of brigands and exacts revenge against his old adversary.

Translation
The book was translated into English by Margaret E. Platon.

Praise
The book received international acclaim and fame and was translated to several languages.

Editorial Reviews
Review
"The sequence of events in the novel could not be more exciting…It is like a myth, but the mythic quality is given concreteness in the distinct personalities of the villagers…This novel is a worthy successor to Memed, My Hawk and ought to send readers swiftly to The Legend of the Thousand Bulls, Anatolian Tales, or The Wind From the Plain…I doubt that anyone who reads They Burn the Thistles will hesitate in seeking these out and concluding that Kemal is an important literary figure." – Paul Theroux, The New York Times

"Yashar Kemal…specializes in proletarian fiction–novels and short stories that bristle with passion and political commitment…Kemal has become Turkey's first world-class novelist…They Burn the Thistles is thus a valuable addition to the body of literature for society's sake" –- The Washington Post.

"There are a lot of facts and folklore in the story along with delightful fantasy, all told with an intimacy of detail that makes for fine reading. Kemal's descriptions of the Turkish landscape, animals and plant life are sharp and vivid. The action is told in the grand manner of the Homeric tradition, but Kemal doesn't miss a butterfly, a hard-backed iridescent beetle or the yellow narcissi of Anatolia. There is the smell of dried sweat and blood, but there is also the sweet scent of stirrup-high mint at the edge of a bubbling brook." – The Los Angeles Times

"…one of the modern world's great storytellers. To read him is to be reminded that life itself is a story. He writes fearlessly, like a hero." – John Berger

"They Burn the Thistles is an epic story of a bitter war during the 1920s between the poor Turkish peasants of the Taurus Mountains of Anatolia and the greedy Aghas who covet their land. When the novel appeared in England a few years ago, British critics said that Yashar Kemal had a feeling for the soil in literature that recalled Thomas Hardy and Ignazio Silone" – The New York Times

"The setting is lyrically described…Kemal is at pains to emphasize the traditional family and village loyalties which, more than vengeance, ultimately provide the only hope for an equitable society." – Times Literary Supplement

Product Description
Turkey's greatest novelist, Yashar Kemal is an unsurpassed storyteller who brings to life a world of staggering violence and hallucinatory beauty. Kemal's books delve deeply into the entrenched social and historical conflicts that scar the Middle East. At the same time scents and sounds, vistas of mountain and stream and field, rise up from the pages of his books with primitive force.

Memed—introduced in Kemal's legendary first novel, Memed, My Hawk, and a recurrent character in many of his books—is one of the few truly mythic figures of modern fiction, a desperado and sometime defender of the oppressed who is condemned to wander in the blood-soaked gray zone between justice and the law. In They Burn the Thistles, one of the finest of Kemal's novels, Memed is on the run. Hunted by his enemies, wounded, at wit's end, he has lost faith in himself and has retreated to ponder the vanity of human wishes. Only a chance encounter with an extraordinarily beautiful and powerful stallion, itself a hunted creature, serves to restore his determination and rouse him to action.

References

External links
 Memed My Hawk (1984) at Internet Movie Database
 Amazon.com

1972 novels
Novels by Yaşar Kemal
Novels set in Turkey